Rydzyny  is a village in the administrative district of Gmina Pabianice, within Pabianice County, Łódź Voivodeship, in central Poland.

The village consists of: 
 Rydzyny Dolne
 Rydzyny Górne
 Rydzyny Długie
 Potaźnia
 Żabiniec

References

Rydzyny